Since their formation in 2006, British new rave/grime band Hadouken! have released three studio albums (Music for an Accelerated Culture, For the Masses, Every Weekend) alongside several singles, mixtapes, EPs, and remixes for other bands.

Original songs

Remixed songs

Cover songs

Remixed songs for other bands/artists

Lists of songs recorded by British artists